Lynnville is a town in Giles County, Tennessee. The population was 287 at the 2010 census. The name is from a local creek. Richland high school is located in Lynnville it serves the town and surrounding areas

Geography
Lynnville is located at  (35.377313, -87.005306).

Lynnville is in the south-central part of Tennessee. It is located on State Route 129, east of U.S. Route 31.

Demographics

As of the census of 2000, there were 345 people, 150 households, and 96 families living in the town. The population density was 1,060.2 people per square mile (403.7/km2). There were 161 housing units at an average density of 494.7 per square mile (188.4/km2). The racial makeup of the town was 87.83% White, 9.57% African American, 1.16% Native American, 0.29% Asian, 0.29% Pacific Islander, and 0.87% from two or more races.

There were 150 households, out of which 28.0% had children under the age of 18 living with them, 46.0% were married couples living together, 11.3% had a female householder with no husband present, and 36.0% were non-families. 35.3% of all households were made up of individuals, and 20.7% had someone living alone who was 65 years of age or older. The average household size was 2.30 and the average family size was 2.98.

In the town the population was spread out, with 23.5% under the age of 18, 7.5% from 18 to 24, 23.2% from 25 to 44, 26.7% from 45 to 64, and 19.1% who were 65 years of age or older. The median age was 41 years. For every 100 females, there were 98.3 males. For every 100 females age 18 and over, there were 89.9 males.

The median income for a household in the town was $36,875, and the median income for a family was $45,000. Males had a median income of $31,875 versus $18,854 for females. The per capita income for the town was $15,147. About 9.8% of families and 14.2% of the population were below the poverty line, including 11.3% of those under age 18 and 22.0% of those age 65 or over.

As of the 2010 census, there were 287 people living in the town. The racial makeup of the town was 91.64% White, 8.01% African American, and 0.35% from two or more races. In the town, the population was 5.57% under 5 years, 13.94% from 5 to 17, 61.32% from 18-64, and 19.16% 65 years and older. 50.17% were male and 49.83% were female.

Notable people
Emma Grigsby Meharg (1873-1937), Texas Secretary of State and educator, was born in Lynnville.

References

External links

Towns in Giles County, Tennessee
Towns in Tennessee